Mairlyn Smith is a Canadian actress, author, critic, food blogger, television show host and professional home economist. In Canada, she is well known for her various cookbooks and expert advice on CityLine and Breakfast TV in Toronto. Outside of Canada, Smith is well-known mostly for her roles as Mrs. Woodhouse, the morbid wife of Principal Woodhouse in the 1999 film The Virgin Suicides, and as Agnes Thurston, the overly cheerful deceased mother of Karen Thurston and wife of deceased chemical factory worker Mr. Thurston, on the 1990s Goosebumps film Welcome to Dead House. Smith resides in Ontario, Canada with her partner, Scott, and their son.

Early life
Little is known about Mairlyn Smith's early life. Born in Vancouver, British Columbia, Smith graduated in 1976 with a degree in home economics from the University of British Columbia. She then returned to school and completed a teaching certificate before going on to teach home economics and head the Department of Fine Arts at Balmoral Junior High. Smith enrolled at the American Academy of Dramatic Arts in California. In the 1980s, she moved to Toronto to find work. Smith is an alumnus of The Second City comedy troupe and has starred in numerous commercials, TV shows, and films. She was initially known for her role as an actress, gaining international notability after her appearances in The Virgin Suicides and Welcome to Dead House (with co-actress Jessica Greco), among other roles. Within Canada, Smith's notable acting appearances included roles on Puppets Who Kill, Street Legal and Adderly, the latter of which was one of her most prominent acting roles in Canada. Smith's last credited acting role was in 2005, when she played a jogger on Puppets Who Kill.

Smith suffered a period of intense grief after the deaths of her mother and father, which occurred closely together. This led her to write her book Peace, Love and Fibre: Over 100 Fibre-Rich Recipes for the Whole Family. According to Smith, "when people don’t embrace their feelings, deciding to store them away for later, it can come back to bite them. You have to admit to yourself that you are under stress and that you need help. You have to accept the feeling is real and authentic." Smith openly discussed her mental health crisis at a FarmTech convention in Edmonton, Alberta. She later stated in a podcast for Eat North that her experience as an actress and her enjoyment of music and teacup collecting in her spare time were things that helped her in life and in her economist career.

Career
Aside from acting, which Mairlyn Smith ceased to participate in post-2005, Smith is a prominent Canadian cookbook author, home economist and food blogger. She has written a number of well-known cookbook titles, most of which promote homegrown eating, a comedic approach to the concept of gut health, Canadian nationalism and easy-to-make recipes. She has been praised by a variety of critics and news reporters, mostly within Canada, including Globe and Mail restaurant critic Dan Clapson, who said of Smith, "no stranger to the food media scene, best-selling cookbook author and CityLine regular, Mairlyn Smith just might be one of the most charming Canadian culinary experts across all media." Smith is a host of television show Harrowsmith Country Life and a subsequent Gemini award nominee. She is a regular guest on CityLine and Breakfast Television Toronto as the family foods specialist and nutrition expert. Toronto Sun noted Smith's prevalence in Canadian homemaking culture, saying, "with [Smith's] bubbly personality, you’ve most likely caught her on CityLine extolling the virtues of fibre. Or perhaps you’ve seen her on Facebook creating healthy recipes, or sharing a cup of tea on YouTube, or leafing through one of her many colourful cookbooks."

Mairlyn Smith regularly contributes to charitable work with her recipes, most notably for World Heart Day in 2010, when she shared free heart-healthy recipes via social media and news outlets, including a popular vegetable stew recipe.

Published works
Mairlyn Smith has written a variety of cookbooks, both in print and in digital format. Her book Lick the Spoon! The Ultimate Healthy Eating Plan, Ultimate Foods for Ultimate Health won gold at the Cuisine Canada Cookbook Awards.

Bibliography
 The Ultimate Healthy Eating Plan (That Still Leaves Room for Chocolate)
 Lick the Spoon! The Ultimate Healthy Eating Plan, Ultimate Foods for Ultimate Health
 Healthy Starts Here!: 140 Recipes That Will Make You Feel Great
 Peace, Love and Fibre: Over 100 Fibre-Rich Recipes for the Whole Family
 Homegrown: Celebrating the Canadian Foods We Grow, Raise and Produce
 The Vegetarian's Complete Quinoa Cookbook (editor only)

Filmography

 Laura's Happy Adventures (video game, as "Marlyn Smith") - Clara (voice, 1998)

References

External links
 

Canadian film actresses
Canadian television actresses
Canadian bloggers
Canadian women bloggers
Canadian women critics
Canadian women economists
Canadian cookbook writers
Canadian food writers
Canadian television hosts
Canadian television talk show hosts
Actresses from Vancouver
Writers from Vancouver
Year of birth missing (living people)
Living people